Christian Metz (December 12, 1931 – September 7, 1993) was a French film theorist, best known for pioneering film semiotics, the application of theories of signification to the cinema. During the 1970s, his work had a major impact on film theory in France, Britain, Latin America, and the United States. As Constance Penley flatly stated in Camera Obscura, "Modern film theory begins with Metz."

Biography
Metz was born in Béziers.

He lectured at the School for Advanced Studies in the Social Sciences (EHESS).

In 1964, he published the article "Le cinéma : langue ou langage?" ("Cinema: language or language-system?") in the journal Communications, and the following books over the next 25 years: Essays on the Signification of Cinema (1968 and 1973), Language and Cinema (1971), Semiotic Essays (1977), The Imaginary Signifier: Psychoanalysis and the Cinema (1977).

In Film Language: A Semiotics of Cinema, Metz focuses on narrative structure — proposing the "Grand Syntagmatique", a system for categorizing scenes (known as "syntagms") in films.

Metz applied both Sigmund Freud's psychoanalysis and Jacques Lacan's mirror theory to the cinema, proposing that the reason film is popular as an art form lies in its ability to be both an imperfect reflection of reality and a method to delve into the unconscious dream state.

His work has been critiqued by Jean Mitry in 1987 in Semiotics and the Analysis of Film, and virulently so by Jean-François Tarnowski in Positif.

In his final work, Impersonal Enunciation, Metz "uses the concept of enunciation to articulate how films 'speak' and explore where this communication occurs, offering critical direction for theorists who struggle with the phenomena of new media." Published in French in 1991, Impersonal Enunciation received little attention in the English-speaking world until it was translated in 2016, an indicator of a resurgence of interest in Metz as a scholar whose work on multi-screen environments was before its time.

Metz died in Paris, aged 61, having taken his own life.

Select bibliography
 Film Language: A Semiotics of the Cinema
 The Imaginary Signifier: Psychoanalysis and the Cinema
 Language and Cinema
 Impersonal Enunciation, or the Place of Film

Notes

Further reading
 Jean Mitry, La Sémiologie en question: Language et cinéma, Paris, Cerf, 1987.
 

French film critics
Film theorists
École Normale Supérieure alumni
Academic staff of the School for Advanced Studies in the Social Sciences
1931 births
1993 deaths
People from Béziers
French semioticians
French male writers
1993 suicides